Platania is a village and a community in the Voio municipality of Greece. In the late Ottoman period, it was inhabited by Vallahades; in the 1900 statistics of Vasil Kanchov, where the town appears under its Bulgarian name "Bobusht'"/"Bobushta", it was inhabited by some 300 "Greek Muslims". Before the 2011 local government reform it was part of the municipality of Neapoli, of which it was a municipal district. The 2011 census recorded 93 inhabitants in the village.

References

Populated places in Kozani (regional unit)